The Griffoens Geel were an ice hockey team in Geel, Belgium. They played in the Belgian Hockey League, the top level of ice hockey in Belgium.

History

The club was founded in 1981. They participated in the Belgian Hockey League, winning the league title in 1996 and finishing as runners-up in 1997, until after the 2001-02 season. They also won the Belgian Cup in 1990.

Achievements
Belgian Hockey League champion (1): 1996.
Belgian Hockey League runner-up (1): 1997.
Belgian Cup champion (1): 1990.

References

External links
Team profile on eurohockey.net

Ice hockey teams in Belgium
Sport in Geel